Chakradhari Sharan Singh (born 20 January 1963) is an Indian Judge. Presently, he is Acting Chief Justice of Patna High Court.

Career
He obtained his LL.B. Degree from University of Delhi. He was enrolled as an Advocate on 30 October 1990. He was appointed as Additional Standing Counsel, Central Government in 1998 and continued as such up to 2001. He practiced in service, constitutional and criminal matters and dealt with cases under Labour Laws and Customs. He was appointed as panel counsel by Comptroller and Auditor General of India for conducting cases on behalf of Accountant General Office in Patna High Court. On 18 September 2010, he was designated as Senior Advocate. He was appointed as Additional Advocate General, Government of Bihar in the year 2010. He was elevated as an Additional Judge of Patna High Court on 5 April 2012. He was appointed as Acting Chief Justice of Patna High Court on 6 February 2023.

References 

Chief Justices of the High Courts of India
1963 births
Living people